The 2023 Forge FC season will be the fifth season in the history of Forge FC. Forge are the defending league champions, having defeated Atlético Ottawa in the 2022 Canadian Premier League Final. In addition to the Canadian Premier League, the club will compete in the Canadian Championship.

Current squad

Transfers

In

Draft picks 
Forge FC made the following selections in the 2023 CPL–U Sports Draft. Draft picks are not automatically signed to the team roster. Only those who are signed to a contract will be listed as transfers in.

Out

Kits
Forge FC unveiled its 2023 primary and alternate kits at a supporters event on March 14 hosted at Tim Hortons Field. Both kits draw inspiration from Hamilton’s city flag by featuring a six-link chain that represents the communities of Hamilton, Ancaster, Dundas, Flamborough, Glanbrook, and Stoney Creek. The kits continue to be produced by Macron and sponsored by Tim Hortons for a fifth consecutive season and for the first time feature sponsorship from CIBC on the left sleeve.

Preseason and friendlies
On February 13, Forge took to the field to begin its preseason. The club travelled to Costa Rica on March 16 for two weeks of training in Alajuela where they will play three friendlies against Primera División sides including LD Alajuelense and Deportivo Saprissa. The team will then return home and play preseason friendlies against League1 Ontario side Sigma FC, NCAA Division I's Syracuse Orange and Akron Zips, U Sports's York Lions, and fellow CPL side and 905 Derby rival York United.

Friendlies

Competitions
Matches are listed in Hamilton local time: Eastern Daylight Time (UTC−4)

Overview

Canadian Premier League

Table

Results by match

Matches

Canadian Championship

Notes

References

External links 
Official site

2023
2023 Canadian Premier League
Canadian soccer clubs 2023 season